Three Crowns is the national emblem of Sweden, present in the coat of arms of Sweden, and composed of three yellow or gilded coronets ordered two above and one below, placed on a blue background. Similar designs are found on a number of other coats of arms or flags.

The emblem is often used as a symbol of official State authority by the Monarchy, the Riksdag, the Government of Sweden and by Swedish embassies around the world, but also appears in other less formal contexts, such as the Sweden men's national ice hockey team, who wear the symbol on their sweaters and hence are called "Three Crowns", and atop the Stockholm City Hall (built 1911–1923). The Three Crowns are also used as the roundel on military aircraft of the Swedish Air Force and as a sign on Swedish military equipment in general, and also on the uniforms and vehicles of the Swedish Police Authority.

Because of their Scandinavian origin, the Three Crowns are also lesser-known features in the royal coat of arms of Denmark where they might be referred to as the "union mark".

Origins 
One of several traditional explanations have suggested Albrekt of Mecklenburg (1338–1412), who ruled Sweden 1364–89, brought the symbol from Germany as a sign of his rule over Sweden, Finland and Mecklenburg.  Apart from the fact that Finland was not regarded as a country in its own right at the time, this theory has been refuted by later research, namely, the announcement in 1982 of the discovery of a frieze in Avignon in southern France, estimated to date back to 1336. The frieze was painted for an international congress led by the Pope and contains the symbols of all participant countries, including Sweden. This discovery suggests the symbol was introduced no later than by Albrekt's predecessor, Magnus Eriksson (1316–74).

Use of the three crowns as a heraldic symbol of Sweden has been attested, in the Nordisk Familjebok, to the late 13th century, the three crowns first ringing the shield of Magnus Ladulås (1240-1290) and later appearing on the coins of Magnus Eriksson (1316-1374).

Early Swedish heraldry

The first coat of arms of Sweden from the 13th century featured a golden lion on a background of wavy blue and white diagonal lines (in blazons, "bendy wavy Argent and azure, a lion Or"). It is still part of the present greater coat of arms of Sweden which is quartered between the lion coat of arms and the three crowns. As the lion and the crowns were occasionally re-interpreted as the coat of arms of the provinces of Götaland and Svealand respectively, the lion was earlier, erroneously, called the "Göta lion".

Use by Scandinavian unions

Union of Magnus Eriksson
Magnus used the symbols frequently, probably to mark his three kingdoms; Sweden, Norway and Scania. At the middle of the 14th century, neighbouring Denmark's severe financial problems caused most of the country to be pawned to German princes, primarily Gerhard III and John III. Since Denmark's king was forced into exile in 1332, the Danish Archbishop in Lund requested that Magnus become king of the Scanian provinces of Denmark. Magnus redeemed the pawn from John III and was sworn in as king of Scania the same year. Since he had also ambitions of redeeming the rest of Denmark, the crowns marked his dignity as king of three realms.

Although Denmark was reconsolidated under King Valdemar Atterdag in 1340 and regained its territory, and Norway left the union with Sweden in 1380, successive Swedish kings continued to use the union coat of arms with the three crowns. An alternative, less well-supported theory suggests that the three crowns are the three kingdoms in the traditional title of the Swedish king, king of Swedes, Goths and Wends. (the two last of which he held in competition with the Danish king). The Swedes-Goths-Wends represent a timely fifteenth-century re-interpretation of the already well-established emblem.

Kalmar Union

When the Kalmar Union, the personal union between Denmark, Norway and Sweden, was instituted by Queen Margrete I in 1397, the three crowns symbol reverted to its use as a symbol of the union of three realms. Her successor, Eric of Pomerania, used a coat of arms quartered between the coats of arms of Denmark (three blue lions on a golden shield), Norway (a golden lion with an axe on a red shield) and Sweden (a golden lion on blue and white wavy stripes) plus the union mark with the three golden crowns on a blue shield, which is also the case for the following union Kings in the 15th century.

Use in post-Kalmar Union Sweden

Since the three crowns had been used in Sweden between the unions, both King Karl Knutsson Bonde, who periodically drew Sweden out of the Kalmar Union, and King Gustav Vasa, who terminated it in 1521, used the crowns quartered with the lion as a symbol of Sweden, and this has continued to the present day. Since the 15th century, the crowns have been regarded as the "main" arms of Sweden and thus can be used independently as the lesser coat of arms of the country.

The symbol is known to have been placed atop the central tower of the castle Tre Kronor (Three Crowns) in Stockholm, destroyed by fire in 1697, no later than the early 16th century.

The Three Crowns Conflict

In the 1550s, King Gustav Vasa of Sweden found that the Danish King Christian III had added the three crowns to his own coat of arms. Because the three crowns had been a Swedish symbol since the 14th century and were used by Danish monarchs only during the Kalmar Union, Gustav interpreted Christian III's use of the symbol as a sign of intent to conquer Sweden and resurrect the union. Christian countered that, since the monarchs of the union had used the three crowns, the symbol now belonged to both kingdoms and he had as much a right as the Swedish king to use it.

In Sweden, the Three Crowns were regarded as an exclusively Swedish symbol. This led to a long-lasting diplomatic conflict between the two countries, the so-called Three Crowns Conflict, with Sweden accusing Denmark of imperialism by using a Swedish symbol, and Denmark accusing Sweden of monopolizing the use of a Scandinavian union symbol.

This conflict played a role at the outbreak of the Northern Seven Years' War in 1563. At the beginning of the 17th century the conflict was settled with both countries being allowed to use the Three Crowns in their coats of arms, although in Denmark it has a less prominent place in the shield, and is officially referred to as a heraldic reminder of the former Kalmar Union. Denmark has used the Three Crowns in this way since 1546, a practice disputed by Sweden until 1613.

Other use in Denmark
The name "Tre Kroner", or Three Crowns, is also used in Denmark. During the 17th, 18th, and 19th centuries, the Royal Danish Navy often named its ships after the insignia of the Danish monarch's coat of arms, and the navy consequently often had a ship named after the Three Crowns. This practice in turn lent the name to the naval fort of Trekroner guarding the harbour of Copenhagen, the Danish capital. It was also the name of a number of farms, causing a new city quarter in Roskilde to take the name "Trekroner" from one such farm.

Other three crown designs 

Some heraldic displays outside of Sweden also incorporate triple crown designs.  Some of the notable of these uses are discussed below.

In Central and Eastern European armory
The historical region of Galicia, now divided between Poland and Ukraine, had under Austro-Hungarian rule as its coat-of-arms a blue shield with three gold crowns as part of the design.  The crowns are said to represent Lodomeria, a historical province that was united with Galicia, while Galicia itself was represented by the black crow.

In French and German armory

The emblem of Henry III of France was "Manet ultima coelo" with three crowns.

The French Caribbean island of Saint Barthélemy was a Swedish colony between 1784 and 1878, and the island's coat of arms includes the three crowns as part of the design.

The German towns of Otterfing and Tegernsee in Bavaria use the three gold crowns on blue design on their coats-of-arms.

In Irish armory

Practically identical to the three crowns of Sweden is that of the coat of arms and flag of the Province of Munster, a region in the southwest of Ireland. Like the Swedish model, it comprises two crowns above and one below. These represent the three great duchies of the province, Desmond, Ormond and Thomond. The design was used as the flag of the Lordship of Ireland between 1171-1541 following the Norman invasion of Ireland until being replaced by the flag of the Kingdom of Ireland.

In English armory

A shield of three golden crowns, placed two above one, on a blue background, has been used a symbol of East Anglia for centuries. The coat of arms was ascribed by mediaeval heralds to the Anglo-Saxon Kingdom of East Anglia and the Wuffingas dynasty which ruled it. The flag of the East Anglian king and saint, Edmund the Martyr consists of three gold crowns on a field of blue (Azure, three crowns Or), The East Anglian flag as it is known today was proposed by George Henry Langham and adopted in 1902 by the London Society of East Anglians (established in 1896). It superimposes the three crowns in a blue shield on a St George's cross.

The three crowns appear, carved in stone, on the baptismal font (c.1400) in the parish church of Saxmundham, and on the 15th century porch of Woolpit church, both in Suffolk.

The emblem of three crowns is evident in East Anglian local heraldry; they appear in the arms of the diocese of Ely and the borough of Bury St Edmunds where the crowns are shown pierced with arrows to represent the martyrdom of St Edmund. They were also included in the arms of the former Isle of Ely County Council, the Borough of Colchester and the University of East Anglia.

A three crowns design is the coat of arms of the city of Kingston upon Hull, a large port in Yorkshire, but this design sees the three crowns stacked vertically and relates back to the Royal charter of 1299. The emblem is used by the city council and the city's two rugby league teams.

In the literature, the coat of arms of the legendary King Arthur is also often given as azure with three crowns or. Indeed, Britain included three realms, Logres (England), Cambria (Wales) and Alba (Scotland).

The University of Oxford uses as its arms the three gold crowns on blue accompanied by an open book.  The origin of the three crowns is not exactly known but may refer to the arms of Thomas Cranley, Chancellor of the University of Oxford in 1390.

Two dioceses of the Church of England use the three crowns emblem; Ely (gules three ducal coronets two over one or) and Bristol (sable three crowns arranged in pale or, similar to the city of Hull).

The first corporate coat of arms was granted in 1439 to the Drapers' Company in London with three triple crowns. Three crowns also form the logo of Coutts, the London-based private bankers, but in this case the design comprises one crown at the top, with two below.

In Scottish armory 

The coat of arms of the chief of Clan Grant displays the three gold crowns on a red background (gules, three ancient crowns or). Earlier it is recorded to have been three gold crowns on a blue background (azure, three crowns or). The Grant arms formed the basis of the arms of the burgh of Grantown-on-Spey, which was founded on the clan's land in 1765.

The coat of arms of the chief of Clan Arthur (or Clan MacArthur) uses the three gold crowns on blue (azure, three antique crowns or).

In Spanish armory

The three gold crowns on blue design appears on the coat of arms of the Spanish city of Burriana in the Valencian Community, but, like Coutts & Co, is arranged one over two instead of two over one.  The crowns here refer to the fact that in 1901, the Queen Regent of Spain, Maria Christina of Austria, gave the town the title of city, and was crowned three times.

In modern trade marks

A symbol with three crowns was used by Chrysler on some of its New Yorker models in the 1960s. A symbol for the marque's top model, the crowns were placed in a row on the vehicle rear and over each other in the front. During the 1980s and 1990s, Broderbund Software used a stylised variant of the symbol.

See also 

 Gustavus Adolphus College
 University of Oxford
 Mother Svea
 Flag of Sweden
 Trekroner Fort
 Triple Crown

References 

National symbols of Sweden
Swedish culture
Swedish heraldry